Naam Gum Jaayega is a 2005 Indian Hindi romantic drama film, written and directed by Amol Shetge. It stars Raqesh Vashisth and Dia Mirza. The film performed very poorly at the box office and was termed "Disaster" by Boxofficeindia.com.

Cast
 Raqesh Vashisth:  Vishal Saxena 
 Dia Mirza: Natasha / Geetanjali 
 Aryan Vaid: Aryan Srivastav
 Mandira Bedi: Nalini Sen
 Divya Dutta: Divya
 Sandeep Mehta: Professor Chandramohan Xeno 
 Anil Nagrath: Father Ribeiro

Soundtrack

References

2005 films
2000s Hindi-language films
Films scored by Anand–Milind
Films directed by Amol Shetge